Shad Qadri (born September 7, 1952 in Pakistan) is a politician and businessman in Ottawa, Ontario. He was the councillor for Stittsville (Ward 6) from 2006 until 2018.

Personal life
Born in Pakistan, Qadri came to Ottawa in 1963. Prior to his entry in municipal politics, Qadri was a businessman and was involved in the community. He is involved in several special events that are held in the community including the Villagefest and Parade, the Christmas Parade of Lights, and Winterfest. He is involved in numerous charities and fundraisers. He is a former director and treasurer for the Western Ottawa Community Resource Centre. He is involved in the development of the ward in which several residential developments are underway or are planned including Kanata West, Jackson Trails and West Ridge.

Shad Qadri and his wife Theresa owned the Showbiz Entertainment And Gifts store in Stittsville which is now closed.

Municipal politics
As a councillor candidate he opposed, like his opponent, the expansion project of the Carp Road landfill which was requested by Waste Management. Like several other councillors, he looked for improvements of public transit, better fiscal accountability, increased security measures and the development of the community. He was however against the expansion project of the O-Train north-south light rail line which was cancelled on December 14, 2006.

On October 27, 2014 he was re-elected to a third term, defeating Dave Lee after gaining 60.94% of the vote. Qadri ran for re-election in the 2018 Ottawa municipal election, where he was defeated by Glen Gower, community activist and volunteer.

Election results

Ottawa municipal election, 2006

Ottawa municipal election, 2018

References

External links
 Shad Qadri official website
 Ottawa Sun: Shad Qadri profile. Retrieved November 14, 2006

1952 births
Living people
Businesspeople from Ottawa
Ottawa city councillors
Carleton University alumni
Pakistani emigrants to Canada
Naturalized citizens of Canada
Canadian politicians of Pakistani descent